Andrea Nahrgang (born February 20, 1978) is an American biathlete. She competed in three events at the 2002 Winter Olympics.

References

External links
 

1978 births
Living people
Biathletes at the 2002 Winter Olympics
American female biathletes
Olympic biathletes of the United States
People from Wayzata, Minnesota
21st-century American women
U.S. Army World Class Athlete Program